Monte Rosa, or Monte Rosa Massif, is a mountain massif of the Alps. The massif's highest mountain is sometimes called Monte Rosa.

Monte Rosa or Mount Rosa may also refer to:

Dufourspitze, the second-highest mountain of the Alps, and highest point of the Monte Rosa massif
Monte Rosa Hut, at the foot of Monte Rosa
Monte Rosa Hotel, in Zermatt
Monte Rosa, São Tomé and Príncipe, a village on the island of São Tomé
Mount Rosa (Colorado), a mountain 9 mi (14 km) southwest of Colorado Springs, Colorado
Institut Monte Rosa, in Montreux
Monte Rosa Alpine Division, a pro-fascist Italian army unit raised by the short-lived Italian Social Republic during World War II
MS Monte Rosa, a number of ships
, a Nazi German cruise ship also known as the HMT Empire.

See also
 Monterosa (disambiguation)
 Montrose (disambiguation)